Great Day for Up! is a book written by Dr. Seuss and illustrated by Quentin Blake. It was published by Random House on August 28, 1974.

Plot
The narrator says that today is a good day for things to go up. As more things are described as getting up, at the very end, the narrator is revealed to be a boy who does not want to get up and wants to sleep in. This ending would later be expanded into I Am Not Going to Get Up Today!.

See also
 List of Dr. Seuss books

References

External links
 Great Day for Up! read by David Selman

Books by Dr. Seuss
1974 children's books
Random House books